Chirnsidebridge is a village near Chirnside in the Scottish Borders area of Scotland, at a bridge over the Whiteadder Water on its journey towards the River Tweed.

The bridge is a three-span rubble bridge with the two main spans segmental-arched.

As the place name varies between Chirnsidebridge and Chirnside Bridge, the paper mill has alternative names: Chirnside Paper Mill and Broomhouse Paper Mill.

See also
List of places in the Scottish Borders
List of places in Scotland

External links
RCAHMS record for Chirnside Bridge
RCAHMS record for Chirnsidebridge, Station Road
RCAHMS record for Chirnsidebridge, Station Road, Toll House
RCAHMS record for Chirnsidebridge, Railway Bridge
SCRAN image: Chirnside Paper Mill, Chirnside, Berwickshire

Villages in the Scottish Borders